Fiji participated at the 2018 Summer Youth Olympics in Buenos Aires, Argentina from 6 October to 18 October 2018.

Athletics

Fiji was given a quota by the tripartite committee to compete in a boys' event.

 Girls' events – 1 quota

Track & road events

Badminton

Fiji was given a quota to compete by the tripartite committee.

Singles

Team

Table tennis

Fiji was given a quota by the tripartite committee to compete in table tennis.

 Girls' singles – 1 quota

References

2018 in Fijian sport
Nations at the 2018 Summer Youth Olympics
Fiji at the Youth Olympics